"Coin-Operated Boy" is a single by The Dresden Dolls duo, taken from the self-titled debut album The Dresden Dolls. It was produced by Martin Bisi and released on December 13, 2004, by Roadrunner Records. "Coin-Operated Boy" was written by Amanda Palmer. The song makes heavy use of staccato, and includes instruments such as a toy piano.

Interpretation
Palmer expounds on the many advantages of an artificial and subhuman partner over real ones in a tick-tock rhythm reminiscent of automata or clockwork. The song has broad overtones of lonely narcissism, and a desire for intimate loyalty and affection without personal sacrifice or vulnerability. Caroline Bologna of The Huffington Post writes that the song "suggests themes of masturbation as it explores the idea of the pleasure of love without the 'complications' of a real partner".

Reception
In Australia, the song was ranked #12 on Triple J's Hottest 100 of 2004.

It has been parodied and used in advertisements and products.

Track listing
German CD single
"Coin-Operated Boy" - 3:33
"Coin-Operated Boy" (Live) - 5:44  (This is the same version as the one found on A Is for Accident.)
"Baby One More Time" (Live) - 3:20

It is in The Dresden Dolls Companion.

Personnel
Amanda Palmer - piano, vocals, lyricist, composer, songwriter
Brian Viglione - drums, guitar
Martin Bisi - Memory Man
Michael Pope - music video director

References

External links
 The Dresden Dolls official site including lyrics and downloads
 Music Video Director's site including music video

2004 singles
The Dresden Dolls songs
2003 songs
Songs written by Amanda Palmer
Roadrunner Records singles